Oscar McDonald (born 18 March 1996) is a former professional Australian rules footballer who played for the Carlton Football Club and  in the Australian Football League (AFL). McDonald has played the majority of his career as defender.

Junior career
After missing out on selection for Vic Country in the 2014 AFL Under 18 Championships, McDonald played nineteen matches for the North Ballarat Rebels in the TAC Cup, with the second half to his season raising his draft chances. His strong season was acknowledged with awards and accolades including, winning the Adam Goodes trophy for the club best and fairest, the TAC Cup coaches award, and he was named as the centre half-back in the TAC Cup team of the year.

AFL career

Melbourne (2015–2020)

He spent the start of 2015 playing for Melbourne's Victorian Football League (VFL) affiliate team, the Casey Scorpions, in the VFL Development League, he was then promoted to the senior VFL team in round three, playing there for most of 2015. He made his AFL debut in the fifty-four point loss against  at Domain Stadium in round 22. He played in his first win the next week and in the final match of the season, when Melbourne defeated  by twenty-six points at Etihad Stadium, which was also the club's first win at the stadium since 2007, ending a twenty-two match losing streak.

After playing in the first and final match of the 2016 NAB Challenge against  and  respectively, McDonald started the season playing in the AFL when he played in the opening round match against Greater Western Sydney in the two point win at the Melbourne Cricket Ground. During the match, he suffered an ankle injury which forced him to miss the next week. Playing for Casey, he received a concussion which saw him miss further football. With the club focusing on youth, he maintained a spot in the seniors for the remainder of the season, which saw him play as the second key back behind his brother, Tom. Despite not missing another match, he did, however, injure his ankle a further two times during the season, in the round 16 match against Fremantle and the round 18 match against . After finding consistency in the back-line, he was awarded the round 21 nomination for the AFL Rising Star in the forty-point win against Port Adelaide at Adelaide Oval, where he recorded twenty-three disposals, nine marks, and five rebound-50s. In August, he signed a two-year contract, tying him to the club until the end of the 2018 season.

Carlton (2021–2022)
After training with the Carlton Football Club ahead of the 2021 AFL season, McDonald was added to the Blues' rookie list as a preseason supplemental selection. Under then-coach David Teague, Carlton played him as a key forward, rather than in defence where he had played with Melbourne. In a curious first game in Round 1, 2021, he became the first player substituted into a game under the AFL's then-new 'medical substitute' rule; he then kicked a goal with his first kick for the club, and a total of two for the game – more goals than in his entire career with Melbourne. He played two more games in 2021 as an unused medical substitute. In 2022, under new coach Michael Voss, McDonald returned to the backline, and was a first choice selection in Carlton's Round 1 team; but was substituted out of the Round 2 game with stress fractures in his back and missed the rest of the season. He was delisted at the end of 2022, after five matches and less than two full matches of game time for the club.

Statistics
 Statistics are correct to the end of the 2020 season

|- style="background-color: #EAEAEA"
! scope="row" style="text-align:center" | 2015
|
| 28 || 2 || 0 || 0 || 14 || 16 || 30 || 13 || 0 || 0.0 || 0.0 || 7.0 || 8.0 || 15.0 || 6.5 || 0.0
|-
! scope="row" style="text-align:center" | 2016
|
| 28 || 15 || 0 || 0 || 117 || 127 || 244 || 63 || 27 || 0.0 || 0.0 || 7.8 || 8.5 || 16.3 || 4.2 || 1.8
|- style="background-color: #EAEAEA"
! scope="row" style="text-align:center" | 2017
|
| 28 || 20 || 0 || 0 || 192 || 116 || 308 || 108 || 32 || 0.0 || 0.0 || 9.6 || 5.8 || 15.4 || 5.4 || 1.6
|-
! scope="row" style="text-align:center" | 2018
|
| 28 || 25 || 0 || 0 || 190 || 100 || 290 || 95 || 31 || 0.0 || 0.0 || 7.6 || 4.0 || 11.6 || 3.8 || 1.2
|- style="background-color: #EAEAEA"
! scope="row" style="text-align:center" | 2019
|
| 28 || 12 || 1 || 0 || 76 || 31 || 107 || 31 || 27 || 0.1 || 0.0 || 6.3 || 2.6 || 8.9 || 2.6 || 2.3
|-
! scope="row" style="text-align:center" | 2020
|
| 28 || 7 || 0 || 0 || 42 || 27 || 69 || 17 || 8 || 0.0 || 0.0 || 6.0 || 3.9 || 9.9 || 2.4 || 1.1
|- class="sortbottom"
! colspan=3| Career
! 81
! 1
! 0
! 631
! 417
! 1048
! 327
! 125
! 0.0
! 0.0
! 8.0
! 5.3
! 13.2
! 4.2
! 1.6
|}

Notes

References

External links

Oscar McDonald's profile from Demonwiki

1996 births
Living people
Melbourne Football Club players
Casey Demons players
Greater Western Victoria Rebels players
Australian rules footballers from Victoria (Australia)
North Ballarat Football Club players
Carlton Football Club players